Rama-bhadra-puram is a village and Ramabhadrapuram mandal headquarters in Vizianagaram district of Andhra Pradesh, India.

Geography
It has an average elevation of 111 meters.

Demography
Ramabhadrapuram mandal had a population of 47,232 in 2001. Males constitute 23,423 and females 23,809 of the population. The average literacy rate is 47%. Male literacy rate is 59% and that of females 35%.

References 

Villages in Vizianagaram district
Mandal headquarters in Vizianagaram district